Lisa Fuller is an American actress best known for her work in movies such as The Monster Squad (1987) and Night Life (1989). She also starred in the movie Teen Witch (1989).

She is married to fellow actor Dan Gauthier.

References

External links

American actresses
Living people
Place of birth missing (living people)
Year of birth missing (living people)
21st-century American women